Centerville Municipal Airport may refer to:

 Centerville Municipal Airport (Iowa) in Centerville, Iowa, United States (FAA: TVK)
 Centerville Municipal Airport (Tennessee) in Centerville, Tennessee, United States (FAA/IATA: GHM)